Perilla teres is a species of Southeast Asian orb-weaver spiders. It is the only species in the genus Perilla. It was  first described by Tamerlan Thorell in 1895, and has only been found in Myanmar, Vietnam, and Malaysia.

References

External links

Araneidae
Spiders described in 1895
Spiders of Asia